DZMB (90.7 FM), broadcasting as 90.7 Love Radio, is a radio station owned and operated by Manila Broadcasting Company though its licensee Cebu Broadcasting Company. It serves as the flagship station of Love Radio Network. The station's studio is located at the Second Floor, MBC Building, Star City, Vicente Sotto St., CCP Complex, Roxas Boulevard, Pasay; while its transmitter is located at the BSA Twin Towers, Bank Drive, Ortigas Center, Mandaluyong, sharing the same site with 96.3 Easy Rock and 101.1 Yes The Best.

As of Q4 2022, 90.7 Love Radio is the 2nd most-listened to FM radio station in Metro Manila, based on a survey commissioned by Kantar Media Philippines and Kapisanan ng mga Brodkaster ng Pilipinas.

History

Early years
Manila Broadcasting Company (MBC) founded the first music radio station in Manila under the callsign DZMB, which started its operations on the AM band on July 1, 1946, and was then originally broadcast at 760 kHz on the AM band. The station was assigned to Cebu Broadcasting Company, an associate to the Elizalde family which also owns MBC. It also served as the sister station of DZRH and another established station DZPI in 1949.

In September 1972, when President Ferdinand Marcos declared Martial Law, the dictatorship shut down and took over radio stations to silenced public criticism and opposition by controlling information that people had access to. DZRH, DZMB, and DZPI were allowed to resume operations a few months later.

Conversion into FM broadcasting
On February 14, 1975, MBC converted DZMB to the FM band, assigned at 90.7 MHz. The station maintained its music programming but it began airing as an easy listening-formatted station, earning the on-air moniker known as "Beautiful Music". Most notable personalities who worked on the station during that time were Mel Tiangco, Jay Sonza, and Reysie Amado.

In the 1980s, Manuelito "Manny" F. Luzon took over the management of the station, and reforming DZMB 90.7 under the new identity: 90.7 Love Radio. With this new strategy, 90.7 Love Radio became one of the most-listened to stations in Manila.

The station's easy listening format lasted for over the next two decades until the beginning of the new millennium.

The Kabisyo era and the ratings game
On February 14, 2000, coinciding with the 25th anniversary, 90.7 Love Radio was relaunched with a new logo and the tagline "Kailangan pa bang i-memorize yan? Bisyo na 'to!"  to have become common everyday expressions of many Filipinos. Since the relaunch, 90.7 Love Radio has been reformatted as a masa (contemporary MOR) station after the success of its sister FM station Yes FM 101.1 (now 101.1 Yes The Best). Over the next years, 90.7 Love Radio became a top-rated station after dethroning Yes FM 101.1 in the radio survey, the success would maintain its #1 position in the FM radio ratings for the next few years.

The early 2000s also began the careers of popular radio personalities. Chris Tsuper and Nicole Hyala launched their own program Tambalang Balasubas at Balahura, originally aired on a late-afternoon/early-evening slot before moving to its current morning slot. Since then, the program began to broadcast via satellite on all Love Radio stations nationwide.

In the mid-2000s, John Gemperle joined the station under his on-air moniker "Papa Jack". He would later launch his love advice program TLC: True Love Conversations, which became one of the most popular night-time radio shows until his departure from the station on December 16, 2016.

Following MBC's acquisition of 96.3 DWRK from the Hodreal family in 2008, MBC reassigned DZMB back to its original station licensee Cebu Broadcasting Company, as the latter took ownership of the said new station.

On October 2, 2019, the main studios of 90.7 Love Radio at the MBC Building in CCP Complex, Pasay, along with its sister MBC Manila radio stations, were affected by a major fire that originated in the nearby Star City theme park. In interim, Love Radio broadcast from its backup studio at BSA Twin Towers in Ortigas Center, Mandaluyong, where its transmitter is located.

On November 15, 2021, after a 2-year hiatus, Love Radio Manila, along with sister stations Easy Rock Manila and Yes The Best Manila, returned to the newly renovated MBC Building inside the Star City complex, which was still under rehabilitation and reconstruction at that time. On the same day, MBC relaunched its new corporate slogan, Sama-Sama Tayo, Pilipino! along with the new logos of all MBC radio stations. However, MBC's AM station DZRH retained its interim studios at the Design Center of the Philippines which is near the MBC Building, but soon followed suit on December 17, 2021.

Awards
Best Male Disk Jockey - ALTA Media Icon Awards for Chris Tsuper (2016)
Best FM Station - ALTA Media Icon Awards (2016)
Best FM Station - 24th KBP Golden Dove  Awards (2016) 
Best FM Station - 23rd KBP Golden Dove Awards (2015)
Best FM Station - 2014 Yahoo PH Celebrity Awards
Best Female Disk Jockey for Nicole Hyala - 2013 Yahoo! OMG Awards
Best Female Disk Jockey for  Nicole Hyala - 2012 Yahoo! OMG Awards
Best Radio Program: Tambalang Balasubas at Balahura for Nicole Hyala and Chris Tsuper - 2012 Yahoo! OMG Awards
Best Male Disk Jockey for Papa Jack - 2012 Yahoo! OMG Awards
Best Male Disk Jockey for Papa Jack - 2013 Yahoo! OMG Awards
Male DJ of the Year for Papa Jack - 2014 Yahoo! Celebrity Awards
Best Radio Comedy Program: Tambalan for Nicole Hyala and Chris Tsuper - 27th KBP Golden Dove Awards (2019)

References

OPM formatted radio stations in the Philippines
Love Radio Network stations
Radio stations in Metro Manila
Radio stations established in 1946